Clare Chambers (born 1966 in Croydon, Greater London, England) is a British novelist of different genres. In 1999, her novel Learning to Swim won the Romantic Novel of the Year Award by the Romantic Novelists' Association.

Biography
Clare Chambers was born on 1966 in Croydon, Greater London, daughter of English teachers. She read English at Oxford University. and, after graduating, she and her future husband, Peter, also a teacher, moved to New Zealand, where she wrote her first novel. The couple lived in Norwood, Surrey, close to Selhurst Park, then moved to Bromley, Kent (where they have lived since 1993) where they brought up their young family.

Bibliography

Single novels
 Uncertain Terms (1992)
 Back Trouble (1994)
 Learning to Swim (1998)
 A Dry Spell (2000)
 In a Good Light (2004)
 The Editor's Wife (2007)
 Bright Girls (2009)
 Burning Secrets (2011)
 Small Pleasures (2020)

References and sources

1966 births
People from Croydon
Living people
English romantic fiction writers
RoNA Award winners
20th-century English novelists
21st-century British novelists
20th-century English women writers
21st-century English women writers
Women romantic fiction writers
English women novelists